Jake Hammond (born 5 December 1991) is an Australian sprinter, who competed in the 2014 IAAF World Relays (4 × 100 metres relay, DNF in Final B) and the 2014 Commonwealth Games (4 × 100 metres relay, DQ in heat).

He works for KONE Australia as an employee of the technical services team (TSG).

References

External links 
 
 

1991 births
Living people
Australian male sprinters
Commonwealth Games competitors for Australia
Athletes (track and field) at the 2014 Commonwealth Games
20th-century Australian people
21st-century Australian people